was a town located in Ama District, Aichi Prefecture, Japan.

As of 2003, the town had an estimated population of 22,795 and a density of 2,736.49 persons per km². The total area was 8.33 km².

On March 22, 2010, Shippō, along with the towns of Jimokuji and Miwa (all from Ama District), was merged to form the new city of Ama.

The town name "Shippo" means cloisonné in Japanese. It is a traditional industry in the  town.

External links 
 Ama official website

References 

Dissolved municipalities of Aichi Prefecture
Ama, Aichi